Đoàn Thanh Lam (born 19 June 1969 in Hanoi) is a famous Vietnamese singer. She is one of the four divas of Vietnam.

Biography

Early life and education
Đoàn Thanh Lam was born in Hanoi to music composer Thuận Yến and traditional music artist Thanh Hương. She has one younger brother, Trí Minh. At the age of nine, Thanh Lam started studying đàn tỳ bà, a Vietnamese traditional music instrument, at the Hanoi Conservatory of Music. In 1985, she switched to study Vocal Music. This was an important turning-point in her music career. After winning several singing contests, she became famous with her father's song, Chia Tay Hoàng Hôn in the National Professional Solo Singer contest in 1991. Her father has been a strong support in her music career, penning many songs that became Thanh Lam's hits, Khát Vọng, Tình Yêu Không Lời, Màu Hoa Đỏ.

Music career
Early in her career, she performed with the Phuong Dong band, where she met composer Quốc Trung. She has produced more than thirty albums to date, collaborating with such prominent Vietnamese composers and singers as Thanh Tùng, Dương Thụ, Lê Minh Sơn and singers Trần Thu Hà, Mỹ Linh, Hồng Nhung, Tùng Dương, and most recently, Trọng Tấn. She has worked with the Vietnamese-Danish jazz musician Niels Lan Doky on several music projects, notably the Vong Nguyet (Wishing Upon the Moon) show at the Roskilde Festival in 2006 and 2007. 

In 1981 (12 years old), she alone went to festival for children in Germany. Songwriter Thuan Yen used to share about this trip as: "She was on stage playing guitar and singing the song Mat Troi va Anh Lua of Tran Long An. She didn't learn how to play guitar but still be able to play it well"

In 1984, she had a performance at International Youth Festival 1984.

In 1985, she stopped learning ty ba instrument to switch to have vocal trained at Ha Noi's Music Institute. This was a big turn of her career later on. Alongside with studying, she and singer Thai Bao launched White Pigeon music band and together they performed everywhere (from 1985 to 1987). Besides, from 1985 to 1991, she was also the member of National's Music Crew and had many performances at many different countries: Germany, Russia, Bulgaria, China, Cuba, Netherlands, Hungary and Romania.

In 1986, she performed the song Mat Troi va Anh Lua at Festival of Political Song in Berlin and won second prize, the song was recorded later and released at the festival.

In 1989, she won Favorite Artist award at La Habana Music Festival (Cuba).

In 1991, she won big prize of National Solo Artist (2nd time) and impressively scoring: all 6 judges rated her 10 scores each. In the final night, she performed two songs: Chia Tay Hoang Hon and Giot Nang Ben Them.

In 1991, she started to live with songwriter Quoc Trung, later he established Phuong Dong music band and they performed together at many music shows.

In 1993, Phuong Dong (with Thanh Lam as main vocal) won first prize of 1st National Ballad Music Band Festival which was held in Da Nang in August.

In 1994, she had an impressive performance at Nua The Ky Bai Hat Viet show which was held by Songwriter Club in Vietnam.

In 1995, she and Phuong Dong music band launched the show Thien Thanh at Ha Noi's Opera House. This was the first music show of Quoc Trung. Songwriter Duong Thu shared his opinion about his favorite performance of the night as: "In this show, Thanh Lam sang the song "Bai Hat Cho Anh" on the remix of Quoc Trung which was really touching. She completely sang my own hope to live in a very charming, intense and sad way".

In 1996, she performed at the show Dem Huyen Dieu for 1 week at Huu Nghi Hall. According to Quoc Trung, this was the first liveshow that he made for her. The success of the show was the big encouragement for another national tour later.

Also in 1996, she was invited to perform at Fukuoka Asian Pop Song Festival (Japan) in May and Jazz Festival in Montreux (Switzerland) in September.. At Fukuoka Festival, she performed the song Giot Nang Ben Them in front of 8,000 audiences, while at Jazz Festival in Montreux, she performed the song Ho Mai Nhi on the jazz remix of Quoc Trung. She also had a duet with a famous Swiss singer Stefan Eicher with the song: Wake Up.

In 1997, 1998, 1999, 2000 and 2001, she always received Top 10 Favorite Artist of Green Wave Award. All of her songs that helped her won the awards as: Khat Vong, Cho Em Mot Ngay, Ben Em La Bien Rong, Giot Nang Ben Them, Hoa Tim Ngoai San, Em Va Toi, Chia Tay Hoang Hon, Mot Ngay Mua Dong, Chieu Xuan, Hoa Co Mua Xuan, Hat Voi Chu Ve Con, Ngoi Hat Ca Benh Bong, Khong The Va Co The, Doi Cho, Do Tinh,...

Personal life 
Thanh Lam was married to composer Quốc Trung from 1994 to 2004; the couple has two children.
Her daughter, Nguyễn Thiên Thanh, is one of bright actress and composer of Youth Theatre of Vietnam. In 2012 she resigned, changed her name and moved to Singapore. April 2018 she won the best songwriter of the year in Hanoi.
Her son Nguyễn Đăng Quang, is one of 10 young faces of Vietnam in 2014. He is a gifted piano player and won many international prizes.

Discography includes
 Nếu điều đó xảy ra 
 Em đi qua tôi (1990)
 Gọi tên bốn mùa
 Bài hát ru anh (1997)
 Nghe mưa (Hồng Nhung) (1997)
 Nghe mưa 2 (Hồng Nhung and Lam Trường) (2007)
 Em và tôi (1998)
 Nơi mùa thu bắt đầu (1998)
 Lá thư (1998)
 Ru đời đi nhé (1999)
 Khát vọng (2000)
 Đợi chờ (2001)
 Mây trắng bay về (2001)
 Giọt lệ tình (Hồng Nhung) (1997)
 Thiện Thanh (2002)
 Tự sự (2004)
 Thanh Lam - Hà Trần (Trần Thu Hà) (2004)
 Nắng lên (2005)
 Ru mãi ngàn năm (2005)
 Em và đêm (2005)
 Này em có nhớ (2005)
 Nợ (Hồng Nhung) (2006) 
 Thanh Lam - Trọng Tấn (Trọng Tấn) (2006)
 Giọt...Lam – Thanh Lam Collection Vol 1 (2006)
 Biệt (Tùng Dương and Trần Thu Hà) (2007)
 Lam Blue 'TA''' (2007)
 Lam xưa (2008)
 Nơi bình yên (2009)
 Thanh Lam Acoustic (2009)
 Sa mạc tình yêu (Đàm Vĩnh Hưng) (1997)
 Yêu (Tùng Dương) (1997)
 Nơi gặp gỡ tình yêu'' (2020)

References

External links
 Thanh Lam's Profile on Nhacso.net

1969 births
Living people
People from Hanoi
21st-century Vietnamese women singers
20th-century Vietnamese women singers
Women singer-songwriters